Congressman Fitzgerald may refer to:

Roy Gerald Fitzgerald (1875–1962)
John Joseph Fitzgerald